is a run and gun video game released by Sega for arcades in 1986. Quartet allows one to four players to guide a set of characters through a base taken over by an army of robots. Players control either Joe (yellow), Mary (red), Lee (blue), or Edgar (green) across 32 side-scrolling levels.  The object of the game is to advance through the level, fighting opponents that come out of portals in the walls, and eventually defeat a boss that carries the door key used to open the "exit door" for the level.

The game was released as a dedicated four-player cabinet similar to Atari Games' Gauntlet. A 2-players version, titled Quartet 2, was released by Sun Electronics, as a conversion kit. The game was ported to the Master System, Commodore 64, Amstrad CPC, and ZX Spectrum.

Reception 
In Japan, Game Machine listed Quartet on their May 1, 1986 issue as being the second most-successful upright/cockpit arcade unit of the month. In the United States, the game topped the Play Meter arcade earnings chart in August 1986.

References

External links

Quartet at arcade-history.com

1986 video games
Amstrad CPC games
Arcade video games
Commodore 64 games
Sega arcade games
Sega video games
Master System games
ZX Spectrum games
Video games featuring female protagonists
Video games developed in Japan